Thomas Luciano Trindade Lopes Mathias (born 14 January 2002), commonly known as Thomas Luciano, is a Brazilian professional footballer who plays as a right-back, centre-back and defensive midfielder for Campeonato Brasileiro Série A club Grêmio.

Club career

Grêmio
Born in Porto Alegre, Brazil, Thomas Luciano joined the Grêmio's Academy at the age of 11 in 2013.

Career statistics

Club

Honours
Grêmio
Recopa Gaúcha: 2022

References

External links

Profile at the Grêmio F.B.P.A. website

2002 births
Living people
Brazilian footballers
Association football defenders
Campeonato Brasileiro Série A players
Grêmio Foot-Ball Porto Alegrense players
Footballers from Porto Alegre